George Edwin William Monk (a.k.a. Ed Monk, Sr.) (Jan 1, 1894 - Port Blakely, Washington, to Jan 21, 1973) was a shipwright and naval architect in the Pacific Northwest of the United States.  He was active from 1914 to 1973. He designed pleasure and commercial vessels, both power and sail.

Shipwright, 1914 to 1925 

Ed Monk, Sr., began his boat building career in 1914 as an apprentice working on Robert Moran's schooner San Juan, under construction on Orcas Island. In 1915, Monk worked with his father again in St. Helens, OR, building The City of Portland, "one of the largest wooden freighters ever built." He continued to work for his father at Meacham and Babcock, a boatyard started in Seattle, WA, during World War I to build twelve wooden freighters for the US Government. During this time, he became more interested in designing boats and began studying toward that end.  Meacham and Babcock closed in 1919. Monk continued to work at various boatyards in Seattle and eventually found his way to the Blanchard Boat Co. in 1925. He was hired as a shipwright, but soon began to design small boats. His first large cruiser design, the 62 foot motor yacht Silver King, was built there in 1925

Naval architect, 1925 to 1973 

At Blanchard Boat Co., Monk got to know the naval architect L. E. "Ted" Geary and in 1926, Geary hired Monk as a draftsman. In 1930, Monk followed Geary to Long Beach, CA. In 1933, Monk quit working directly for Geary and moved back to Washington state.  Monk maintained his association with Geary as his local representative.

Monk began his independent career as a naval architect by designing and building his "Plan No. 1," the 50 ft. bridge-deck cruiser Nan, which became his home for seven years, moored at the Seattle Yacht Club, and was briefly his office. His designs were built by many of the Pacific Northwest builders like Blanchard Boat Co., Grandy Boat Co., Jensen Motor Boat, Chambers and Franck, Forder Boatworks, McQueen Boat Works, and Tollycraft among others.

Ed Monk, Sr., wrote two books on boat building:
 Monk, Edwin, Small Boat Building, 1934, revised 1947, published by Charles Scribner's Sons, New York
 Monk, Edwin, Modern Boat Building, 1939, revised 1949 and 1973, published by Charles Scribner's Sons, New York

Monk designed commercial vessels which included tugs and cargo carriers.  He also designed the "Super Shrimp Trapper (SST)" Mimi for Ivar Haglund, launched in 1967.

Monk continued to design boats up until his death in 1973 at the age of 79. He had "produced more than 3,000 boat designs ranging from 6 foot dinghies to yachts and workboats in the 150 foot range."

Ed Monk, Sr., designed and built both sailboats & powerboats:

Sailing Yachts

Aries, 50 feet, launched 1941
Mariner III, 42 feet, launched 1941
Symra, 43 feet, launched 1941
Cumulus, 26 feet, launched 1947
Bendora, launched 1948
Halcyon II, launched 1948
Netha, 45 feet, launched 1936
Madwenowe, launched 1967
Mikay IV, 46 feet, launched 1959
Moonraker, 50 feet, launched 1962
Sea Witch, 29 feet, launched 1939
Moonsail, 32 feet, launched 1946

Motor Yachts 

 Ann Saunders, 32 feet, launched 1926
 Nan, 50 feet, launched 1934
 Port Madison Gal, 24 feet, launched 
 Western Maid I, 40 feet, launched 1946
 Western Maid II, 42 feet, launched 1947
 Duffy, 35 feet, launched 1950
 Alerion, 42 feet, launched c. 1952
 Whim, 37 feet, launched c. 1957
 Tatoosh, 40 feet, launched 1959
 Nika Sia, 46 feet, launched 1965
 Tryphena, 50 feet, launched 1970

References

External links 
 Ed Monk Wooden Boat Club
 Classic Yacht Association List of Current Motor Yachts Designed by Ed Monk, Sr.
 Nan

1894 births
1973 deaths
Architects from Seattle
Boat and ship designers
American yacht designers
American shipwrights